Daniel Olsson-Trkulja (born March 3, 1991) is a Swedish professional ice hockey player currently under contract to Frederikshavn White Hawks in the Metal Ligaen (DEN).

He originally played with AIK IF in the Elitserien during the 2010–11 Elitserien season.

After two seasons with Linköpings HC, Olsson-Trkulja left as a free agent following the 2018–19 campaign to sign a two-year contract to continue in the SHL with newly promoted Leksands IF on 11 April 2019.

References

External links

1991 births
Living people
AIK IF players
Frederikshavn White Hawks players
Leksands IF players
Linköping HC players
Sparta Warriors players
Swedish ice hockey centres
Ice hockey people from Stockholm